The National Credit Union Share Insurance Fund provides deposit insurance to protect the accounts of credit union members at federally insured institutions in the United States. Created in 1970, the Share Insurance Fund is administered by the National Credit Union Administration, an independent federal financial regulator. The Share Insurance Fund is funded completely by participating credit unions, and not one penny of insured savings has ever been lost by a member of a federally insured credit union.  The Share Insurance Fund is backed by the full faith and credit of the United States government.

As of December 2016, Share Insurance Fund insured an estimated $1 trillion in member shares in more than 5,800 federally insured credit unions.

Funding, premiums and dividends 

In 1970, Congress approved, and President Richard M. Nixon signed, Public Law 91-206 (see 12 U.S.C. §§ 1781–1790(c)), creating the National Credit Union Administration as an independent federal financial regulator. Soon after, Congress established the National Credit Union Share Insurance Fund and made NCUA responsible for its administration.

The Share Insurance Fund is approximately $13 billion in total, made up of $2.8 billion in retained earnings and approximately $10 billion in contributed capital from credit unions. Contributed capital is the one percent of insured shares deposited by each federal credit union, as well as all federally insured, state-chartered credit unions.  The Federal Credit Union Act requires the NCUA Board to set a target equity ratio of at least 1.20 percent and no more than 1.50 percent of total insured deposits.  It is NCUA Board policy that the normal operating equity ratio is 1.30 percent.

The majority of the fund is invested in United States treasury securities, with a portion of the earnings being used to fund NCUA's operations. NCUA gets about $200 million of its current budget from the Share Insurance Fund, with the remainder coming from operating fees charged to regulated credit unions.

In the event that the equity ratio of the fund falls below 1.20 percent, the Federal Credit Union Act requires the NCUA Board to charge credit unions a premium or to develop and implement a restoration plan for the fund. The NCUA Board has discretion whether to charge a premium when the equity ratio is between 1.20 percent and 1.30 percent.

NCUA has assessed a Share Insurance Fund premium three times since the Fund was recapitalized in 1984: 1991, 2009 and 2010.

NCUSIF insured accounts 
The Share Insurance Fund protects members' accounts in federally insured credit unions in the event of a credit union failure. The fund insures the balance of each members' account, dollar-for dollar, up to the standard maximum share insurance amount of $250,000. NCUA insurance covers all types of member shares received by a credit union including:

 Share draft accounts (aka "checking accounts").
 Share savings that can be added to or withdrawn from at any time.
 "Money market share" accounts, essentially high-interest share savings accounts (the name is similar to "money market funds" which are     not insured).
 Share certificates (CDs), which generally require funds be kept in the account for a set period.
 Outstanding Cashier's Checks, Interest Checks, and other negotiable instruments drawn on the accounts of the credit union.

NCUA publishes a variety of resources for consumers to better understand insurance coverage on their deposits at federally insured credit unions, including:

 The Share Insurance Estimator, NCUA's interactive site which allows users to input data to compute the amount of Share Insurance Fund coverage available under different account scenarios, and
 NCUA's share insurance publications How Your Accounts Are Federally Insured and Your Insured Funds. Both publications are available in English and Spanish.
 A three-part YouTube series designed to educate depositors about the protection offered by the National Credit Union Share Insurance Fund. 
The Share Insurance Fund also provides funding when a credit union is no longer able to continue operating, the credit union will be liquidated and the NCUSIF will pay member shares up to $250,000.

Since the passage of the Federal Deposit Insurance Reform Act of 2005 deposits were insured for up to $100,000 per insured account, or $250,000 for certain retirement accounts.

The passage of the Emergency Economic Stabilization Act of 2008 increased the amount of covered shares to $250,000 until the end of 2013. This increase was made permanent by the Dodd–Frank Wall Street Reform and Consumer Protection Act in July 2010.

References

Further reading

External links

Credit unions of the United States
Deposit insurance in the United States